Scutellaria orientalis, also known as yellow-flowered skull cap or yellow helmet flower, is a species of alpine rhizomatous perennial belonging to the genus Scutellaria, and classified under the family Lamiaceae.

Description
The deciduous plant is woody-based, and its leaves are dark green and deeply toothed. The stems grow directly from the ground. Its flowers are yellow, upright tubes with hooded tops up to 3 cm long. They grow very densely together during the prime of the season in summer. The plant has a USDA Zone-5 hardiness level, and is able to grow in the harsh conditions of alpine tundra.

References

Alpine flora
orientalis